Diagnosis Mercury: Money, Politics and Poison is a 2008 book by Jane Hightower. The book explains that mercury is a poison and that the majority of mercury in the environment comes from coal-fired power plants.  But the book is mainly concerned with human exposure from the eating of large predatory fish such as swordfish, shark, king mackerel, large tuna, etc. The book also discusses industrial mercury poisonings, such as those in Minamata, Japan, in the 1950s and Ontario, Canada, in the 1970s.

See also
Mercury in fish
Minamata Convention on Mercury

References

External links
Diagnosis: Mercury
Mercury poisoning symptoms and fish recommendations
Mercury poisoning time line
Mercury guidelines
Author Bio at California Pacific Medical Center
Mercury Facts

Medical books
Medical controversies
2008 non-fiction books
2008 in the environment
Mercury (element)